All My Heroes Are Dead may refer to:

 All My Heroes Are Dead (Dar Williams album), a 1991 album
 All My Heroes Are Dead (R.A. the Rugged Man album), a 2020 album